The Rally of Tanzania is an international rally racing event organised by the Automobile Association of Tanzania. The rally is based in the port city of Dar es Salaam and travels south-west to Pugu hills for its competition stages. The event is a round of the African Rally Championship and the Tanzanian National Rally Championship.

The event was first run in 2001 as a largely amateur event and was not held again until 2004 when a considerably more ambitions event was held. The rally became part of the African championship in 2005, becoming the opening round of the season. 2013 saw a calendar reshuffle to mid-season as well as a location shift from Bagamoyo to the Pugu Hills.

Zimbabwean driver James Whyte is the only driver to have scored more than one victory after winning back-to-back in 2009 and 2010.

List of winners
Sourced in part from:

References

External links
Official website
Tanzanian National Rally Championship
African Rally Championship

Motorsport in Africa
Recurring sporting events established in 2001
2001 establishments in Tanzania
African Rally Championship
Rally competitions in Tanzania